Chang Almas District is a district (bakhsh) in Bijar County, Kurdistan Province, Iran. At the 2006 census, its population was 14,357, in 3,121 families.  The District has two cities: Babarashani & Pir Taj. The District has three rural districts (dehestan): Babarashani Rural District, Khosrowabad Rural District, and Pir Taj Rural District.

References 

Bijar County
Districts of Kurdistan Province